Xianzhaqiao is a town in Shaodong, Hunan, China. It is surrounded by Weijiaqiao Town on the south, Jiulongling Town on the west, and Shuangfeng Township on the east.

History
In 1956 it was incorporated as a township. In 1965 it was renamed "Xianzhaqiao People's Commune". In 1984 it was upgraded to a town.

Administrative division
As of 2017, the town is divided into forty-five villages and one community.

Geography
The Zi River flows through the town.

Education
Xianzhaqiao Central Middle School
Xianzhaqiao Lingshansi Middle School

Economy
The economy is supported primarily by hardwares.

Transport
The S90 Hengyang-Shaoyang Expressway is an east–west highway in the town.

The County Road X019 passes across the town north to south.

References

Divisions of Shaodong